Sir Charles may refer to:

People
 Sir Charles (basketball) nickname of U.S basketball player Charles Barkley
 Sir Charles (wrestler) ringname of U.S. pro-wrestler Charles Wright
 Sir Charles Jones (born 1973) U.S. blues musician

Other uses
 Sir Charles (horse) (foaled 1816) U.S. racehorse
 Sir Charles Tupper Secondary School, Vancouver, British Columbia, Canada; aka "Sir Charles"
 Sir Charles Kingsford-Smith Elementary School, Vancouver, British Columbia, Canada; aka "Sir Charles"

See also

 
 King Charles (disambiguation)
 Prince Charles (disambiguation)
 Lord Charles (disambiguation)
 Charles (disambiguation)
 Sir (disambiguation)